Třinec is a city in Frýdek-Místek District in the Moravian-Silesian Region of the Czech Republic. It has about 34,000 inhabitants and is the least populated statutory city in the country.

The city is an important cultural centre of the Polish minority in Trans-Olza, which makes up 12.1% of the population (as of 2021).

Třinec is notable for the Třinec Iron and Steel Works steel plant, the largest in the country, which still has a major impact on the city, on its character, demographics, and air quality.

Administrative parts
Třinec is made up of thirteen town parts and villages:

 Dolní Líštná
 Guty
 Horní Líštná
 Kanada
 Karpentná
 Kojkovice
 Konská
 Lyžbice
 Nebory
 Oldřichovice
 Osůvky
 Staré Město
 Tyra

Etymology
The name Třinec is of topographic origin, derived from the Slavic word for reed (Polish: trzcina, Czech: třtina).

Geography
Třinec is located in the historical region of Cieszyn Silesia.

Třinec lies on the Olza River. The northern part of the municipal territory is located in the Moravian-Silesian Foothills. The southern, sparsely populated part is located in the Moravian-Silesian Beskids mountain range and in the Beskydy Protected Landscape Area.

Climate
Třinec has a humid continental climate (Cfb in the Köppen climate classification).

History

The first written mention of Třinec is from 1444, but the village was probably founded already in the second half of the 14th century. Politically, the village then belonged to the Duchy of Teschen, a fee of the Kingdom of Bohemia, which after 1526 became part of the Habsburg monarchy. In 1770, the village had about 200 inhabitants and was completely agricultural.

The area was rich in iron ore deposits and had sufficient water energy and a high supply of wood, which were the main reasons to establish an iron works there. The iron mill began operation in 1839, becoming the largest in the entire Cieszyn Silesia, and became a major milestone in the history of the village, which reoriented itself to industry. After the construction of the Košice–Bohumín Railway line in 1871, rapid development of the town took place.

After the revolutions of 1848 in the Austrian Empire, a modern municipal division was introduced in the re-established Austrian Silesia. The village as a municipality was added to the political and legal district of Cieszyn. According to censuses conducted in 1880–1910, the population of the municipality grew from 1,792 in 1880 to 3,849 in 1910, with a majority being native Polish speakers (growing from 51.4% in 1880 to 96.6% in 1900 and 96% in 1910), accompanied by a German-speaking minority (at most 32.5% in 1880, then dropping to 12.2% in 1900, and up to 24.3% in 1910) and Czech speakers (peaking in 1890 at 17.4%, then dropping to 6.7% in 1910). In terms of religion, in 1910 the majority were Roman Catholics (63.2%), followed by Protestants (34.5%), and Jews (1.9%). The village was also traditionally inhabited by Cieszyn Vlachs, speaking the Cieszyn Silesian dialect.

After World War I, the fall of Austria-Hungary, the Polish–Czechoslovak War, and the division of Cieszyn Silesia in 1920, it became a part of Czechoslovakia. In 1931, Třinec was promoted to a town.

Following the Munich Agreement in October 1938, together with the Zaolzie region, it was annexed by Poland, administratively adjoined to Cieszyn County of the Silesian Voivodeship. It was then annexed by Nazi Germany at the beginning of World War II. After the war, it was restored to Czechoslovakia.

In 1946, the villages of Lyžbice, Dolní Líštná, and Konská were joined to Třinec. In 1956–1977, a large housing estate was built in Lyžbice, and it became the most populated town part of Třinec. Afterwards, Lyžbice became a new downtown, taking the place of Staré Město (lit. "old town").

The municipalities of Guty, Karpentná, Nebory, Oldřichovice, Ropice, Tyra, and Vendryně were joined to Třinec in 1980. However, Vendryně became an independent municipality in 1995 and Ropice followed in 2000. In 2018, Třinec became a statutory city.

Demographics

Economy

The Třinec Iron and Steel Works company is one of the largest employers in the Czech Republic. Including smaller production plants outside Třinec, the company employ 7,000 people (as of 2021).

Culture

The year's biggest event is the Hutnický den ("Metallurgy Day"), which features numerous live performances from bands and artists from all over the country and abroad. It takes place every year in May, but was not held in 2020 and 2021.

From 1993 to 2012, one of the oldest and most famous rock festivals in the Czech Republic, Noc plná hvězd ("star-studded night"), was held here every year.

Sport
The city is represented by the successful ice hockey team HC Oceláři Třinec, which has been playing in the Czech Extraliga since 1995 and has won four times. Oceláři (Steelers) play their home games at Werk Arena, which opened in 2014 and has a seating capacity of 5,400. The arena also hosted the Team Czech Republic at the 2016 Davis Cup World Group.

The city's football team, FK Třinec, plays in the Czech National Football League (second tier of the Czech football system).

The floorball club FBC Intevo Třinec plays in the third tier of the men's competition and in the second tier of the women's competition. The team plays its home games in the SH STARS sports hall.

Třinec also has an athletics club, founded in 1951. Sports that have a tradition in Třinec include orienteering, weightlifting, Greco-Roman wrestling, road cycling, and chess.

Sights
Třinec is poor in monuments. The main historic landmark is the Church of Saint Albert, built in the 1880s.

A notable building is the wooden Church of Corpus Cristi in Guty. The original church from the 16th century was destroyed by a deliberate fire in 2017. In 2021, a replica was completed on its site.

In 1969, Třinec Iron and Steel Works opened a company museum, which has been jointly operated with the city as the museum of both the company and the city since 1992.

Notable people

 Tadeusz Kraus (1932–2018), footballer
 Eduard Ovčáček (born 1933), graphic artist, sculptor, lettrist, and painter
 Michaela Dolinová (born 1964), actress and TV presenter
 Petr Šiška (born 1965), TV presenter and musician
 Petr Pravec (born 1967), astronomer
 Roman Sikora (born 1970), playwright
 Jana Cieslarová (born 1971), orienteer
 Edvard Lasota (born 1971), footballer
 Vojtěch Kučera (born 1975), poet
 Czeslaw Walek (born 1975), lawyer and LGBT activist
 Martin Staszko (born 1976), professional poker player
 Lenka Cenková (born 1977), tennis player
 David Szurman (born 1981), ice dancer
 Lukáš Rakowski (born 1982), figure skater
 Václav Svěrkoš (born 1983), footballer
 Tomáš Klus (born 1986), musician
 Soňa Pertlová (1988–2011), chess player
 Ewa Farna (born 1993), Polish-Czech singer
 Adam Gawlas (born 2002), darts player
 Lake Malawi (formed 2013), indie pop band

Twin towns – sister cities

Třinec is twinned with:
 Bielsko-Biała, Poland
 Žilina, Slovakia

References

External links

 
Cities and towns in the Czech Republic